The 46th Grand Prix Automobile de Pau (Pau Grand Prix), was the third round of the 1986 International Formula 3000. This race was held around the streets of the city of Pau, Pyrénées-Atlantiques, south-western France, on 19 May.

Report

Entry
For this round, a total of 37 arrived in Pau for the race, with just 21 spaces available on the grid for the race.

Qualifying
Emanuele Pirro took pole position for Onyx Racing, in their March-Cosworth 86B, averaging a speed of 86.239 mph.

Race
The race was held over 73 laps of the Circuit de Pau-Ville. Mike Thackwell took the winner spoils for works Ralt team, driving their Ralt-Honda RT20. The Kiwi won in a time of 1hr 31:17.92., averaging a speed of 82.276 mph. Second place went to the poleman, Emanuele Pirro aboard the Onyx Racing entered March-Cosworth 86B, who was 6.15 seconds adrift. The podium was completed by the Frenchman, Michel Ferté in the Team Oreca’s March-Cosworth 86B, a further 20 seconds behind.

Classification

Race Result

References

Pau
Pau
Pau Grand Prix